Alan Coates (born December 3, 1945) is an executive in the National Hockey League who most recently served as the Executive Director of 2012 IIHF World Junior Championship.

Coates is a former General Manager of the Calgary Flames, a post he held from November 1995 until the end of the 1999–2000 NHL season. He then was named the Vice President of Hartford Sports and Entertainment for the New York Rangers from 2000–03.

Coates served as interim General Manager of the  Anaheim Ducks in 2004–05 before becoming the Senior Advisor to the General Manager. He then served as the Director of Player Personnel for the Toronto Maple Leafs in 2008. He won the Stanley Cup in 1989 with Calgary as Assistant to the President, and in 2007 with Anaheim as Senior Advisor to the General Manager.

External links

Al Coates' profile at mightyducks.com
Globe and Mail: Leafs add Al Coates
Globe and Mail: Wilson backs visors for all his troops

1945 births
Living people
Anaheim Ducks executives
Anaheim Ducks personnel
Calgary Flames general managers
Calgary Flames personnel
National Hockey League executives
New York Rangers executives
People from Perth County, Ontario
Stanley Cup champions
Toronto Maple Leafs executives